Václav Mára (born August 5, 1943 in Sedlec-Prčice) is a Czechoslovak sprint canoer who competed in the late 1960s. He finished sixth in the K-1 1000 m event at the 1968 Summer Olympics in Mexico City.

References
 Sports-reference.com profile

1943 births
Canoeists at the 1968 Summer Olympics
Czechoslovak male canoeists
Czech male canoeists
Living people
Olympic canoeists of Czechoslovakia
People from Příbram District
Sportspeople from the Central Bohemian Region